Johnny Vicious (born John Coles) is an American house DJ, producer and remixer. He DJed in New York City clubs Mars and Paladium in the 1980s, and in the early 1990s started his own label, Vicious Muzik Records, with Jeffrey Rodman.

Vicious became widely known for remixing the hits "Kiss You All Over" by No Mercy, "Let's Go All the Way" by React, and "It's Not Right but It's Okay" by Whitney Houston, as well as doing remixes for the compilations Webster Hall Presents: A Groovilicious Night and Ministry of Sound: Club Nation America. He scored one major chart hit, 2005's "Can't Let Go" (featuring Judy Albanese), which hit No. 4 on the US Billboard Dance Chart. His remixes have appeared on the hit Ultra.Dance compilations, as well as on the ThriveMix Presents albums, many of which have hit the US Billboard albums charts.

Discography

Albums/mixed compilations
Liquid Bass EP: Volume 1 (Vicious Muzik Records, 1993)
Grind: All Night House Music Party (Continuum Records, 1994)
The Beginning (Vicious Muzik Records, 1995)
New York in the Mix (Subversive Records, 1996)
Ministry of Sound: Club Nation America (Ultimix Records, 2001) US Heatseekers #40, US Independent #17
Ultra.Dance 01 (Ultra Records, 2002) US Heatseekers #14, US Electronic #3, US Independent #12
Ultra.Dance 03 (Ultra Records, 2003) US Heatseekers #6, US Electronic #1, US Independent #4
Ultra.Trance:3 (Ultra Records, 2004) US Heatseekers #9, US Electronic #4, US Independent #10
Deeper & Harder, Vol. 1 (Dee Vee Music, 2004) US Electronic #22
Ministry of Sound: Clubber's Guide, Vol. 1 (Ultimix Records, 2005) US Electronic #8
ThriveMix Presents: Trance Anthems, Vol. 1 (ThriveDance, 2006) US Electronic #10, US Independent #44
ThriveMix Presents: Electro, Vol. 1 (ThriveDance, 2007) US Heatseekers #46, US Electronic #10
ThriveMix Presents: Dance Anthems, Vol. 1 (ThriveDance, 2007) US Heatseekers #8, US Electronic #2, US Independent #27
ThriveMix Presents: Trance Anthems, Vol. 2 (ThriveDance, 2007) US Heatseekers #30, US Electronic #6
ThriveMix Presents: Dance Classics, Vol. 1 (ThriveDance, 2007) US Electronic #15
Total Music: Dance Classics, Vol. 1 (ThriveDance, 2010) US Electronic #16

Singles/EPs
"Can't Let Go" (feat. Judy Albanese) (Nervous Records, 2006)

Remixography
Angel Clivillés - Show Me
Ashley Tisdale - It's Alright, It's Ok
Ayumi Hamasaki - Crossroad
Ayumi Hamasaki - M
Ayumi Hamasaki - Mirrorcle World
BoA - Eat You Up
BoA - I Did It for Love
Beyoncé - Ego
Brainbug - Rain
Britney Spears - Gimme More #1 on Billboard's Hot Dance Club Play Chart
Britney Spears - Piece Of Me #1 on Billboard's Hot Dance Club Play Chart
Byron Stingily - That's the Way Love Is
Cher - You Haven't Seen the Last of Me
Chicane - Don't Give Up
Dido - Here with me
Duncan Sheik - Reasons for Living
Erika Jayne - Give You Everything
Evanescence - Call Me When You're Sober
Gigi D' Agostino - L'Amour Toujours (I'll Fly With You)
Jason Derülo - Whatcha Say
Jerry Calliste, Jr. - Al-Naafiysh (The Soul)
Jessi Malay - On You
Jennifer Hudson - Spotlight
Julien-K - Kick the Bass
Kat DeLuna featuring Elephant Man - Whine Up #1 on Billboard's Hot Dance Club Play Chart
Kat DeLuna - Run the Show
Loleatta Holloway - The Queen's Anthem
Madonna - Celebration
Madonna - Miles Away
Mai Kuraki - Yes or No
Mayra Veronica- If You Wanna Fly #5 on Billboard's Dance/Electronic Overall Single Sales Chart
Michael Jackson featuring Akon - Wanna Be Startin' Somethin' 2008
Mariah Carey - Auld Lang Syne (The New Year's Anthem)
M2M - Don't Say You Love Me
Natasha Bedingfield featuring Sean Kingston - Love Like This #1 on Billboard's Hot Dance Club Play Chart
Natasha Bedingfield - Pocketful of Sunshine #1 on Billboard's Hot Dance Club Play Chart
Natasha Bedingfield - Unwritten #1 on Billboard's Hot Dance Club Play Chart
Ono - Give Peace a Chance
Sa-Fire - Exotique
Shakira - Illegal #1 on Billboard's Hot Dance Club Play Chart
Shontelle - Impossible 
Snake River Conspiracy - Vulcan (EP) 
The Ting Tings - Shut Up and Let Me Go
The White Tie Affair - Candle (Sick & Tired)
Hikaru Utada - Automatic
Veronica - Release Me (Let Me Go)
Veronica - Someone to Hold
Whitney Houston - I Look to You
Whitney Houston - It's Not Right but It's Okay

References

External links

American house musicians
Club DJs
American DJs
Living people
Remixers
Nightlife in New York City
Year of birth missing (living people)
People from Bradley Beach, New Jersey
Electronic dance music DJs